Saazish is a 1975 Bollywood action film directed by Kalidas. The movie revolves around a couple of Jaideep who was a car racer and Sunita who won the Miss Cosmos beauty contest in the USA. They fell in love and were on a world tour where they unknowingly get involved  into a conspiracy which shakes their faith in each other. The villain of the movie Mr. Wong wanted to kill Sunita as she had discovered some secret which if given to Interpol would have proven costly for Wong's gold smuggling business. Jaideep who was an undercover agent boards the same ship through which the gold was being smuggled tries to get to the boss and burst the syndicate while saving his love Sunita during the mission.

Cast
David as Captain Thompson
Saira Banu as Sunita
Dharmendra as Jaideep
Brahm Bhardwaj as Jaideep's boss
Helen as  Lola, Singer/Dancer on ship
Iftekhar as Interpol Officer Mohanlal Saxena
Dev Kumar as  Hunsui / I.Y. Natrajan / Boss
Murad as Sunita's paternal uncle
Rajendra Nath as Peter Kumar "P.K." Murray
Paintal as Pinto
Madan Puri as Wong
Jagdishraj as Hunsui's doctor

Soundtrack
Lyrics: Hasrat Jaipuri

 "Na Takht Chaahiye Na Taaj Chaahiye" - Asha Bhosle
 "Na Takht Chhaahiye" v2 - Asha Bhosle
 "How Sweet Daadaaji Aise Na" - Asha Bhosle, Ranu Mukhrjee
 "Hum Toh Lenge Sab Ki Balaayen" - Mahendra Kapoor
 "Woh Bade Khush Naseeb Hote Hain" - Suman Kalyanpur, Mahendra Kapoor
 "Tujhe Humne Chaha Apna Samajh Kar" - Saira Banu, Mahendra Kapoor
 "Hai Phir Zara Zara Koi Teer Sa Chubha" - Sharda

References

External links
 

1970s Hindi-language films
1970s crime action films
Indian crime action films
Films scored by Shankar–Jaikishan